Merriam is an unincorporated community in Northumberland County, Pennsylvania, United States.

Unincorporated communities in Northumberland County, Pennsylvania
Unincorporated communities in Pennsylvania